Goloventsino is a rural locality (a selo) in Novoalexandrovskoye Rural Settlement, Suzdalsky District, Vladimir Oblast, Russia. The population was 6 as of 2010. There are 4 streets.

Geography 
Goloventsino is located 6 km southwest of Suzdal (the district's administrative centre) by road. Suzdal is the nearest rural locality.

References 

Rural localities in Suzdalsky District